A Guarantee of Origin (GO or GoO) is an energy certificate defined in article 15 of the European Directive 2009/28/EC. A GO labels electricity from renewable sources to provide information to electricity customers on the source of their energy. Guarantees of origin are the only precisely defined instruments evidencing the origin of electricity generated from renewable energy sources.

Certificate 
In operation, a GO is a green label or tracker that guarantees that one MWh of electricity has been produced from renewable energy sources. Guarantees of origin are traded. When a company buys guarantees of origin, as documentation for the electricity delivered or consumed, the guarantees of origin are cancelled in the electronic certificate registry. This single standardized instrument makes it possible to track ownership, verify claims and ensure that guarantees of origin are only sold once and that there is no double counting.

In their most accomplished form, guarantees of origin are issued electronically for a controlled quantity of electricity generation (1 GO per MWh), traded and redeemed (i.e. used) by suppliers as evidence to their customers of the quality of the delivered electricity. Generation from renewable energy sources is the most sought-after attribute. A new development concerns guarantees of origin for cogeneration heat plants (or CHP). Some countries already have guarantees of origin issued for all types of electricity generation.

AIB statistics from 2016 show that Germany, Switzerland, Sweden and the Netherlands are the largest markets for guarantees of origin in Europe. While Europe's biggest market, Germany, halted its rapid growth, the Dutch market continued to grow at a faster pace than the rest, almost reaching 50 TWh in 2016.

Guarantees of origin should not be confused with the Eugene Green Energy Standard or EKOenergy labelling scheme. Both provide consumers with more information about their power (transparency). However, Eugene and EKOenergy go further by requiring additionality. In addition, Eugene and EKOenergy are private initiatives whereas guarantees of origin arise from European regulations.

Governance 
The GO is standardized through the European Energy Certificate System (EECS) provided by the Association of Issuing Bodies (AIB). The European Energy Certificate System makes trade, cancellation and use of GOs standardized across AIB members.

Terminology

Production period 

Refers to the month and year when the electricity was produced.

Issued 

GOs created in a month for electricity produced in an earlier month.

Transfer 

Transfer is the delivery process of GO from one party to another.

Import – export 
GOs can originate from a country other than the country of consumption. GOs can be imported (exported) from another country either via import (export), or via cancellation.

Cancellation 

Cancellation is analogous to physical 'use' of a GO certificate and is the method for allocating the attributes of the electricity to the single end-user. Cancelling a GO is the only way to redeem its benefits while ensuring that the certificate will not be traded, given, sold, or used by another end-user. Consumer information and avoidance of double counting is the main objective of this system.

See also
European Energy Certificate System
CHP Directive
EKOenergy
Green certificate (Europe)

References

External links
e-track: a European Tracking System for Electricity 
Association of Issuing Bodies
Commerg - Guarantees of Origin: How it works
Ofgem UK: What are REGOs
Greenfact: Analytical tool for the Guarantees of Origin market

Product certification
Electric power in the European Union
Energy policies and initiatives of the European Union